Dame de Traversay is a town on the island of Saint Lucia in the Anse la Raye Quarter; it is located towards the heart of the island, just below Durandeau.

Towns in Saint Lucia